Western Star Trucks Sales, Inc. is an American truck manufacturer headquartered in Portland, Oregon, and a subsidiary of Daimler Truck North America, which is in turn a wholly owned subsidiary of the Germany-based Daimler Truck.

History

In 1967 White Motor Company started the Western Star division as White Western Star with a new plant at Kelowna, British Columbia, sharing headquarters with White in Cleveland, Ohio. White Western Star trucks in that era typically used cabs from its sister company, Autocar. Western Star production was moved to Ogden, Utah, but the brand was not included in the 1981 sale of White's truck business to Volvo, instead being sold to Bow Valley Resources and Nova Corporation, each owning 50%.

In 1991, Western Star Trucks was purchased by the owners of the Western Star Australian subsidiary, Terry Peabody and Bob Shand. Western Star Trucks acquired the bus manufacturer Ontario Bus Industries (renamed Orion Bus Industries) in 1995. ERF trucks was purchased by Western Star in 1996. It was sold in 2000 to MAN.

In 2000, Western Star was purchased by DaimlerChrysler, becoming part of the Freightliner Trucks division.

In 2002, Western Star production was moved to a plant in Portland, Oregon. 4700, 4800, 4900 and 6900 model trucks are still manufactured in the Portland Truck Plant. In May 2015, the Daimler Trucks North America plant in Cleveland, North Carolina, began to build 4700 and 4900 models, as well as assemble all new semi tractor 5700XE models.

More recently, Western Star MBT 40 trucks operated for bauxite mining in Guinea.

Models

Western Star produces a range of Class 8 commercial vehicles for both highway and off-road use. Western Star specializes in trucks tailored to customer specifications. Every Western Star offers several sleeper box sizes, with chassis lengths of up to 486 inches depending on model. Five interior packages are available and sleepers can be trimmed to specifications. Engines, transmissions, axles, suspensions and brakes are available in a number of configurations. Engines used include Cummins and Detroit. Western Star also produces right-hand drive trucks for the Australian, New Zealand and South African markets.

Western Star trucks are available with anti-lock brakes, traction and stability control, and other modern safety features in order to remain competitive and meet DOT regulations.

Model Information

Western Star currently has six model families:
The 4700 Series is Western Star's entry-level model and is available in truck and tractor applications, both with a  BBC. In vocational applications, its engineering helps reduce upfitting time and costs for body builders, and can be outfitted for virtually any vocational application. For on-highway use, the 4700 is available in a daycab and with 40" sleeper configuration and is primarily used in short haul applications.
The 4800 Series offers more powerful engine options than the 4700 and features a  BBC. Western Star provides the truck as a bare chassis and cab, which can be fitted with a dump body, mixer, tank, crane, or other structure by a bodybuilding company as desired by the customer. The factory-installed twin steer option is also popular on this model for dump and mixer applications.  Tractor versions are also available.
The 4900 Series features a  BBC. This is a multi-use truck/tractor which is targeted at a variety of industries. The truck can be built as a tractor with fifth wheel, bare chassis for a bodybuilder to outfit, or a lowered-cab model (Low Max) for auto hauling. The 4900 is available in five configurations including Extreme Duty and Twin Steer.
The X-series features a  BBC and is available as set forward or set back front axle. It is aimed for the vocational market. Engine choices are Detroit or Cummins with up to 605 hp / 2050 lb-ft.
The 5700XE launched in 2015 and is currently designed only for on-highway applications. The truck features a  BBC, and a set back front axle position. It can be specified as a daycab or as a sleeper. Optimus Prime transforms into this vehicle in the Transformers films Age of Extinction and The Last Knight.
The 6900 Series is the highest capacity model built by Western Star and is designed for off-highway vocations including logging, mining, and other similar applications. Available in Extreme Duty and Twin Steer configurations (XD and TS), each features a  BBC and can be recognized both by its size as well as by its flat, squared front fenders.

See also

 Daimler Truck North America
 Freightliner Trucks
 White Motor Company

References

External links

Western Star official website
Australian Western Star Trucks
Star Nation - Official Western Star Trucks Fan Site

Companies based in Portland, Oregon
Daimler Truck
Emergency services equipment makers
Truck manufacturers of the United States
Vehicle manufacturing companies established in 1967
 
1967 establishments in Oregon